Chad Allen (born c. 1974) is a Canadian curler from Brantford, Ontario. He is currently the alternate on Team Travis Fanset.

Career
In 2002 Allen won the Boston Cash Spiel and the Nissan Classic in Brantford. His team was a finalist at the 2011 AMJ Campbell Shorty Jenkins Classic.

In 2002, Allen won the Ontario Tim Hortons Colts Championship.

Allen has played skip for most of his career, although he was the third for Jason Young in 2008-09 (and at the 2010 provincial championship) and for Nick Rizzo in the 2010–11 season.

References

External links
 

Curlers from Ontario
Sportspeople from Brantford
Living people
1970s births
Canadian male curlers